Johan Brolenius (born 7 June 1977 in Örebro) is a Swedish former alpine skier who competed in the 2006 Winter Olympics. At these Olympics, he finished 8th in the Men's slalom and 18th in the Men's combined.

External links
 sports-reference.com
 

1977 births
Living people
Swedish male alpine skiers
Olympic alpine skiers of Sweden
Alpine skiers at the 2006 Winter Olympics
Sportspeople from Örebro
21st-century Swedish people